The Great McGonagall is a 1974 British comedy film directed by Joseph McGrath and starring Spike Milligan in the title role, Peter Sellers as Queen Victoria and Julia Foster as Mrs McGonagall. It is a humorous biopic of the Scottish poet William McGonagall that includes several of McGonagall's actual poems, his appearing in the title role of Macbeth and his "improvement" of the Bard's plot, his pilgrimage to Balmoral Castle, the attempted assassination of Queen Victoria by Roderick McLean and a tribute to McGonagall from Lt Frederick Rollo of the Royal Scots in Zululand.

Principal cast
 Spike Milligan – William McGonagall
 Peter Sellers – Queen Victoria
 Julia Foster – Mrs. McGonagall
 John Bluthal
 Victor Spinetti
 Valentine Dyall
 Clifton Jones
 Julian Chagrin
 Charlie Young Atom

Production
On the DVD commentary Joseph McGrath recounted the film was made in three weeks at Wilton's Music Hall in London, including one week of rehearsal. Peter Sellers was on the film for only one week. McGrath said Sellers "insisted on coming and guesting in it" and played the role of Queen Victoria on his knees, wearing roller-skates.

The film was produced by British pornography producer David Grant, who forced McGrath to put in some nude scenes and used the film as a tax write-off. McGrath also dubbed midget Charlie Atom's lines when he was unavailable for the dubbing of the film.

The Great McGonagall was the seventh in a string of flops for Sellers, whose career improved with his next film The Return of the Pink Panther (1975).

Critical reception
In The New York Times, Richard Eder wrote "The Great McGonagall, which opened yesterday at the Cinema Village, is endearing, and parts of it are lively and hilarious. But it lacks enough of an organizing principle in its chaos to succeed as a movie...The pace is frenetic, the level of reality shifts every two minutes, it is stuffed with visual absurdities, old jokes and take-offs. Some work, some exasperate...McGonagall dies, and you are sorry. Despite his madness, his delusions, his bad poems, you miss him. He is a radiant failure. So, in a way, is his movie, with all bad jokes, carelessness and confusion."

Books
A related book, The Great McGonagall Scrapbook by Spike Milligan and Jack Hobbs, was published by M & J Hobbs in 1975. A paperback edition was published by Star Books in 1976. Milligan and Hobbs co-wrote three more McGonagall books: William McGonagall: The Truth at Last (1976, with illustrations by Peter Sellers), William McGonagall Meets George Gershwin: A Scottish Fantasy (1988) and William McGonagall: Freefall (1992).

References

External links

1974 films
1974 comedy films
British comedy films
Films about poets
Films about poetry
Films directed by Joseph McGrath (film director)
Cultural depictions of Queen Victoria on film
1975 comedy films
1975 films
Biographical films about poets
1970s English-language films
1970s British films